Birillus (died 90 AD) of Antioch was an early Christian saint. He was ordained to the priesthood by Saint Peter and became the first evangelizer and the first bishop of Catania in Sicily.

Notes

90 deaths
People from Antioch
Saints from Roman Syria
Sicilian saints
Bishops of Catania
1st-century Christian saints
1st-century Italian bishops
Year of birth unknown